Sea Life Sunshine Coast at Mooloolaba, Sunshine Coast, Queensland, Australia is a marine mammal park, oceanarium and wildlife sanctuary. Sea Life Sunshine Coast is an institutional member of the Zoo and Aquarium Association (ZAA). The attraction is a Sea Life Centre owned by Merlin Entertainments, and is globally referred to as Sea Life Sunshine Coast by the firm. It was formerly known as UnderWater World.

History

UnderWater World officially opened in 1989.

Several scenes in the Jackie Chan 1996 film Police Story 4: First Strike were shot in the park, including a scene in the main aquarium. In one of the scenes a tourist family is visible in the reflection on one of the tanks.

During the period of Christmas on 2006 UnderWater World had a giant squid preserved in a block of ice on display.

In July 2013, UnderWater World's owners, Merlin Entertainments, announced that they would be spending $6.5 million on the refurbishment of the facilities. As part of the process, the aquarium was rebranded as a Sea Life Centre and relaunched in December 2013.

Exhibits

Some examples of the largest exhibits at the aquarium include:

Ocean Tunnel

A moving walkway in a  shark tunnel under the  oceanarium takes visitors past several viewing windows, with fish swimming all around the walkway. The exhibit includes three separate habitats: coral reef, cave and open ocean. Its residents include grey nurse sharks, tawny nurse sharks, grey reef sharks, whitetip reef sharks, blacktip reef sharks, leopard sharks, ornate wobbegongs, rays, giant groupers, potato cods, snappers and trevallies. One resident a brown whipray has lived at the aquarium since 1989.

In November 2011, the shark tank and moving walkway were closed for an upgrade.

Seal Island

There are about seven seals at Sea Life Sunshine Coast, one New Zealand fur seal, two Australian fur seals and four Australian sea lions which make up part of the Seal Island exhibit.

Little penguins are a recent addition to the aquarium, with a specially built exhibit constructed for a family of them.

Other exhibits include: Bay of Rays, Billabong, Coastal Wrecks, Coral Kingdom, Freshwater Streams, Frogs, Jellyfish Kingdom, Seahorse Sanctuary and Tidal Touchpools.

Shows and talks

Sea Life Sunshine Coast presents seal shows and wildlife information talks, and has hands-on marine displays. Shows at the park include:

Seal Shows in the Seal Stadium
Stingray Reef talks
Ocean Tunnel Tours
Touch Pool
Jellyfish Tours 
Behind the Scenes Tours

Conservation

Sea Life Sunshine Coast is a rehabilitation centre for turtles, seals, and other marine animals.

References

External links

Aquaria in Australia
Oceanaria
Maroochydore
Tourist attractions on the Sunshine Coast, Queensland
Sea Life Centres
Merlin Entertainments Group
Buildings and structures on the Sunshine Coast, Queensland
Zoos in Queensland
1989 establishments in Australia